The Edinburgh Readings on the Ancient World is a book series that aims to provide an introduction to key themes in the history of the ancient world. The series is published by Edinburgh University Press. Each volume takes the form of an introduction by a specialist in the field followed by translations of primary sources, explanations of key terms and other material.

Titles
Sparta, Michael Whitby, 2001. 
Greeks And Barbarians, Thomas Harrison, 2001. 
The Ancient Economy, Walter Scheidel and Sitta von Reden, 2002. 
Sex and Difference in Ancient Greece and Rome, Mark Golden and Peter Toohey, 2003. 
Roman Religion, Clifford Ando, 2003. 
Athenian Democracy, P.J. Rhodes, 2004. 
The Athenian Empire, Polly Low, 2008. 
Augustus, Jonathan Edmondson, 2009. 
Greek Athletics, Jason König, 2010. 
Augustus, Jonathan Edmondson, 2014.

References

Series of history books